Plummer E. Lott (born ) is a retired American professional basketball player and a New York Supreme Court justice.

Born in Mississippi, Lott was a 6'5" (1.96 m) and  small forward whose brief NBA career lasted with the Seattle SuperSonics from 1967 to 1969. The former Seattle University star was selected by the expansion SuperSonics in the fifth round of the 1967 NBA draft.

Judicial career

Following his NBA career, Lott attended the University of Washington School of Law, graduating in 1974. After several years working as an attorney in New York City, Lott was appointed in 1991 as a judge of the New York City Criminal Court. In 1995, he was elected to the New York State Supreme Court. From 1996 to early 2009, Lott served in the Criminal Branch of the Supreme Court in Brooklyn, presiding primarily over felony cases. One of the best-known cases over which he presided involved David Hampton, a con man who posed as film legend Sidney Poitier's son — a case that inspired the play Six Degrees of Separation, and a 1994 film adaptation of the same name.

In March 2009, New York Governor David Paterson appointed Lott as a justice of the Appellate Division of the New York Supreme Court, Second Department, based in Brooklyn.

Notes

External links
NBA stats @ basketballreference.com

1945 births
Living people
African-American basketball players
African-American judges
American men's basketball players
Basketball players from Mississippi
New York Supreme Court Justices
Seattle Redhawks men's basketball players
Seattle SuperSonics draft picks
Seattle SuperSonics players
Small forwards
21st-century African-American people
20th-century African-American sportspeople